Increase the Pressure is the second album by the British punk rock band Conflict. It was released in 1984 by Mortarhate Records.

Track listing
"Increase the Pressure" – 1:58
"Law and Order (Throughout the Land)" – 1:02
"From Protest to Resistance" – 2:37
"Tough Shit Mickey" – 2:42
"Punk Inn'It?" – 1:19
"As Others See Us" – 1:50
"Cruise..." – 9:53
"The Positive Junk" – 2:05
"The System Maintains" – 2:35
"Berkshire Cunt" - 2:43
"The Guilt and the Glory" – 3:28
""Stop the City"" – 1:25
"One Nation Under the Bomb" – 2:07
"Blind Attack" – 1:52
"Vietnam Serenade" – 0:58
"Blood Morons" – 1:47
"Exploitation" – 2:10
"Whichever Way You Want It" – 4:40

The first part is a studio recording, but from track eight is a live recording made at the Brixton Ace, on 8 October 1983.

Personnel

Band
Colin Jerwood – vocals
Steve Gittins – guitar
Big John (born John Clifford) – bass
Francisco "Paco" Carreno – drums

Production
Conflict – production
Russ White - artwork

References

Conflict (band) albums
1984 albums